Vedic religion or Vedic Hinduism may refer to:

Historical Vedic religion, the religion of the Indo-Aryans of northern India during the Vedic period
Hinduism, which developed out of the merger of Vedic religion with numerous local religious traditions
Śrauta, surviving conservative traditions within Hinduism

See also
 Vedas, a large body of religious texts originating in ancient India
 Vedanta, originally a word used in Hindu philosophy as a synonym for that part of the Veda texts also known as the Upanishads
 Vedic (disambiguation)
 History of Hinduism